Shirley Cruz Traña (born 28 August 1985) is a Costa Rican professional footballer who last played as a midfielder for OL Reign of the National Women's Soccer League and the Costa Rica women's national football team. A creative midfielder who often acts as a deep-lying playmaker, Cruz is the second-ever female footballer from Costa Rica to play abroad when she joined Lyon in 2005.

Early life
Cruz was born in the capital city of San José and discovered and learned the sport of football from her seven brothers.

Club career
Cruz began her football career at CF Universidad in San Pedro, San José. Cruz made a name for herself following her performance at the 1999 edition of the Los Juegos Deportivos Nacionales de San Carlos, translated as the National Sporting Games of San Carlos. She later played for local clubs AD Goicoechea, CS Desamparados, and UCEM Alajuela. With Alajuela, Cruz won three league titles and also earned the top scorer award once.

Due to her performances locally, she signed with UCEM Alajuela and, in January 2006, moved abroad signing with Division 1 Féminine club Olympique Lyonnais. With her move, she became only the second Costa Rican women's football player, alongside Gabriela Trujillo, to play league football outside the country. Due to joining the club mid-season, Cruz appeared in only seven league matches scoring three goals. The 2006–07 season saw her playing time increase to 12 matches and also saw Lyon win their first league title under their new emblem. In the Challenge de France, Cruz was instrumental in helping Lyon reaching the final, where they lost to Montpellier on penalties scoring four goals in five appearances. The next season saw Lyon win the double following their league title and 3–0 victory over Paris Saint-Germain in the Challenge de France. Cruz appeared in 32 total matches, which included appearances in the UEFA Women's Cup.

Cruz appeared in all 22 league matches (starting 20) during the 2008–09 season, which saw Lyon win their third straight title. She also appeared in all seven UEFA Women's Cup matches, where Lyon suffered elimination in the semi-finals after losing 2–4 on aggregate to German club FCR 2001 Duisburg. On 18 September 2009, Cruz, for the first time, signed with Lyon under professional terms (previously contracts were semi-professional) after agreeing to a two-year contract, which will keep her at the club until 2011. Cruz got off to a quick start for the 2009–10 season scoring a hat trick in the opening league match against AS Montigny-le-Bretonneux, which ended in a 6–0 victory.

Cruz signed with Chinese Women's Super League team Jiangsu Suning in January 2018.

In March 2020, Cruz signed with OL Reign for the 2020 NWSL season, which due to the pandemic, was reformatted and condensed to shorter post tournament style competitions, the Challenge Cup and Fall Series. In December 2020, Cruz resigned with Reign for the 2021 NWSL season. In December 2021, OL Reign waived the rights to Cruz and she left the club.

International career
Cruz has earned caps with the Costa Rican under-19 and under-20 women's teams. Her first appearance with the senior team occurred at the 2002 CONCACAF Women's Gold Cup, which served as a qualifying tournament for the 2003 FIFA Women's World Cup. Following a match in 2004 against Canada, in which she suffered a sprained right knee, Cruz did not feature with the national team for the next two years, due to commitments with her football club. In 2006, she made herself available for selection making her return to the team during qualification for the 2006 CONCACAF Women's Gold Cup.

Costa Rica qualified for its first ever FIFA Women's World Cup tournament and Cruz captained the team at the 2015 FIFA Women's World Cup in Canada, playing all three of Costa Rica's matches.

Honors
San José FF
First Women's Division of Costa Rica: 2000

UCEM Alajuela
First Women's Division of Costa Rica: 2003, 2004

Lyon
Division 1 Féminine (6): 2006–07, 2007–08, 2008–09, 2009–10, 2010–11, 2011–12
Coupe de France Féminine (2): 2007–08, 2011–12
UEFA Women's Champions League (2): 2010–11, 2011–12

Jiangsu Suning
Chinese FA Cup: 2018
Regional cup: 2018

Alajuelense FF
First Women's Division of Costa Rica: 2019, Apertura 2022, Clausura 2022
UNCAF Women's Interclub Championship: 2022

Costa Rica
Central American Games: 2013
Pan American Games Bronze medal: 2019
CONCACAF Women's Championship runner-up: 2014

Individual
IFFHS CONCACAF Woman Team of the Decade 2011–2020
CONCACAF Best XI: 2015, 2016
CONCACAF Female Player of the Year second place: 2014
CONCACAF Female Player of the Year third place: 2013, 2015

References

External links
 
 
 Profile  at Fedefutbol
 Profile at Paris Saint-Germain
 Profile  at Olympique Lyonnais
 

1985 births
Living people
Women's association football midfielders
Costa Rican women's footballers
Footballers from San José, Costa Rica
Costa Rica women's international footballers
2015 FIFA Women's World Cup players
Pan American Games bronze medalists for Costa Rica
Pan American Games medalists in football
Footballers at the 2019 Pan American Games
Footballers at the 2011 Pan American Games
Footballers at the 2015 Pan American Games
Central American Games gold medalists for Costa Rica
Central American Games medalists in football
Division 1 Féminine players
Olympique Lyonnais Féminin players
Paris Saint-Germain Féminine players
Costa Rican expatriate footballers
Costa Rican expatriate sportspeople in France
Expatriate women's footballers in France
Costa Rican expatriate sportspeople in China
Expatriate women's footballers in China
OL Reign players
National Women's Soccer League players
Medalists at the 2019 Pan American Games
FIFA Century Club